Van der Gouw is a Dutch surname.  Notable people with the surname include:

 Ennio van der Gouw (born 2001), Dutch footballer
 Raimond van der Gouw (born 1963), Dutch footballer

See also
 Gouw
 Jessica De Gouw

Dutch-language surnames